Procambarus niveus is a small, freshwater crayfish endemic to Cuba. It is a cave-dwelling species known from only one cave, Cuevas de Santo Tomas, in the Sierra de los Organos mountains, Pinar del Río Province.

References

Cambaridae
Cave crayfish
Freshwater crustaceans of North America
Crustaceans described in 1964
Endemic fauna of Cuba
Taxa named by Horton H. Hobbs Jr.